Chelmer may refer to the following places:
 Australia
 Chelmer, Queensland, a suburb of Brisbane
 Chelmer Police College, a heritage-listed former police barracks
 Chelmer railway station
 Chelmer Reach, a reach of the Brisbane River
 England
 Chelmer Village, a suburb of Chelmsford, Essex
 River Chelmer, a river in Essex